Northern Angami II is one of the 60 Legislative Assembly constituencies of Nagaland state in India. It is part of Kohima District and is reserved for candidates belonging to the Scheduled Tribes. It is also part of Nagaland Lok Sabha constituency. Neiphiu Rio, the incumbent Chief Minister of Nagaland, is the current MLA of this constituency.

Members of Legislative Assembly

Election results

2018

2014 By-election 
This by-election was needed due to the resignation of the sitting MLA, Neiphiu Rio following his election to the Lok Sabha.

2013

2008

See also
List of constituencies of the Nagaland Legislative Assembly
 Angami
 Nagaland (Lok Sabha constituency)

References

Kohima district
Assembly constituencies of Nagaland